Lawson L. Aschenbach (born November 22, 1983) is an American professional racing driver. He is a four-time Pirelli World Challenge champion, and most recently, the 2014 Pirelli World Challenge GTS Champion. He is the 2006 SPEED World Challenge (later Pirelli World Challenge) Rookie of the Year and became the first person to win the SPEED GT Championship in his rookie season. He is also the champion of the 2010 Grand-Am Continental Tire Sports Car Challenge (later IMSA Continental Tire Sports Car Challenge) ST Championship and 2014 Lamborghini Super Trofeo ProAM World Champion.
Aschenbach first raced professionally in 2005. He currently races for Stevenson Motorsports in the IMSA Continental Tire Sports Car Challenge.

Amateur career
Aschenbach was born in Gaithersburg, Maryland and began kart racing at age 8. He was introduced to kart racing by his father, who drove him to his first competitions. In 1998, Aschenbach won the World Karting Association Gold Cup. He won an additional four WKA Grand Nationals titles and the North American Karting Championship before moving onto racecars at age 16. In 2001, Aschenbach won the SCCA Southeast National Formula Ford title. He won the SCCA Pro FF2000 series’ Road to Indy Oval Crown Championship a year later.

Professional career
Aschenbach began racing professionally in the SPEED World Challenge (later Pirelli World Challenge) in 2005 and had a podium finish in his first GT race. In 2006, during his first full SPEED World Challenge GT season, Aschenbach won at the Grand Prix of St. Petersburg and placed second at both Mid-Ohio Sports Car Course and Road America. He never finished lower than ninth that season, and became the first driver to win the SPEED GT Championship in his rookie season. That year Porsche won the SPEED GT Manufacturers’ Championship over second-place Dodge by three points. Aschenbach began driving for Team Cadillac during the 2007 SPEED World Championship GT season and finished the season ranked third. That year Aschenbach and teammate Andy Pilgrim led Team Cadillac to the SPEED GT Manufacturers’ Championship.

In 2010 Aschenbach and co-pilot David Thilenius won the Grand-Am Continental Tire Sports Car Challenge (later IMSA Continental Tire Sports Car Challenge) ST Championship with team Compass360. The championship was decided on the final day of racing, with Lawson and David winning the overall championship via tiebreaker. Aschenbach and Compass360 won the subsequent tiebreaker with their third-place finish at Miller Motorsports Park.

Aschenbach won the 2011 Pirelli World Challenge Touring Car Championship while piloting a Honda Civic Si for Team Compass360. He won five races and poles that season, and led Honda to the Pirelli World Challenge Touring Car Manufacturers’ Championship. Aschenbach clinched the championship in the second-to-last race that year and finished the season with 1,543 points.

Aschenbach later joined Blackdog Speed Shop and piloted the team’s Chevrolet Camaro to the 2013 Pirelli World Challenge GTS Championship in what was his first season in the division. Aschenbach scored his first win that season in what was only his second weekend with Blackdog. He won a class-best six races that season, but trailed Jack Baldwin until the last race of the season held at Grand Prix of Houston. Aschenbach’s win at Houston secured the overall championship.

Aschenbach repeated as Pirelli World Challenge GTS Champion in 2014 in his second season driving for Blackdog Speed Shop. He clinched the championship during the final race day of the year, which was held at Miller Motorsports Park. In the first race of a doubleheader at the track, Aschenbach placed fourth and moved within to two points of the overall lead.  His second-place finish in the final race of the season secured for him the overall GTS championship.  Aschenbach finished the season with four wins overall.  Later that year, he won the 2014 Lamborghini Super Trofeo ProAm World Championship at the Sepang Circuit with co-pilot Kevin Conway and Change Racing.

Personal life
Aschenbach is an alumnus of Landon School. He is a 2006 graduate of Vanderbilt University, where he earned a Bachelor of Science while double majoring in engineering and mathematics. Aschenbach married Beth Beattie in November 2013.

Motorsports career results

NASCAR
(key) (Bold – Pole position awarded by qualifying time. Italics – Pole position earned by points standings or practice time. * – Most laps led.)

Xfinity Series

Sports car racing

IMSA WeatherTech SportsCar Championship results

* Season still in progress

Championships

Pirelli World Challenge

IMSA Continental Tire Sports Car Challenge

References

External links

 
 Official Website
 Stevenson Motorsports

Vanderbilt University alumni
Living people
NASCAR drivers
U.S. F2000 National Championship drivers
24 Hours of Daytona drivers
1983 births
Racing drivers from Maryland
People from Gaithersburg, Maryland
Meyer Shank Racing drivers
WeatherTech SportsCar Championship drivers